The Fortress of Harilaq  ( or Kështjella e Harilaqit, /Gradina or Ариљача/Ariljača; 4th–6th century AD), is situated on top of the hill known by the local toponymy as the Gradina – Harilaq, set in an elevated and dominant position, west from the Ariljača village. The fortress is located in an altitude of maximum 766 metres above sea level, and is approximately sited 9 km southeast from the town of Kosovo Polje and only 2 kilometres west from Pristina International Airport "Adem Jashari".

The total surface of the fortress, also counting the circular walls/ ramparts, measures around 1.3 hectares of the inner space of the stronghold. The archaeological excavations at this site were conducted in several seasons, commencing in 2005 and were carried out systematically until 2010 by the staff of the Museum of Kosovo, particularly the Archaeological Institute of Kosovo. Nonetheless, several conservations and consolidations of the circuit walls were done in order to preserve the remains. During the five archaeological seasons' works, numerous remains and foundations of sacral, profane and utilitarian buildings were discovered. In regard, the entire outer sides of the rampart with towers at the axes were unearthed, as well as a church with three naves and a Saskrity are discovered, but also two almost identical structures in a rounded shape of an unknown sacral complex has been uncovered, as well. On the other hand, vast movable archaeological material composed of: metal made working tools, jewelry, coins, bricks, glass fragments and architectural structures, all clear indications that pinpoint to the Late Antique date and especially typical for the Justinian Period. Also, at this fortress traces of prehistoric periods have been evidenced, especially emphasizing the metal periods, but it continued to exist all through antiquity and up to the Medieval Period. Discovered and recorded findings from this site of excavations from 2005 to 2008 were presented at the International Conference on Illyria: Illyri Meridionale et l'Epire dans l'antiquite, Act du V colloque internacional de Grenoble, 8–11 octobre 2008, held in Grenoble, France.

Introduction 

The Harilaq castle differs from other fortifications of this period, not only within Kosovo but throughout the Central Balkans. This stronghold enters in the group of castles and fortifications reconstructed and constructed in Dardania (61 reconstructed and 8 constructed) by Byzantine emperor Justinian the Great (527–565 AD), recorded in the written work by Procopius in the 6th century, in his book De Aedificiis – On BuildingsOn Buildings – Procopius.

The fortress differs from the other castles for the construction of the curtain wall, for interior architectural structures and binding material used. Situated on top of a hill, like most castles from this period in the region, it controls a large landscape view over a large area of Kosovo, with portions of the Municipalities of Kosovo Polje, Pristina, Obilić, Lipjan, Ferizaj, Štimlje and Glogovac visible. Besides toponyms known to local population, as the castle or the Upper Gradina, there is identified a large concentration of stones and bricks, unusual for the locals' tradition of contemporary constructions, which were taken and used by residents of the area, presenting clear indications of the existence of a castle in the Ariljača.

This castle, with its rampart, interior architectural objects, is incomparable and has no analogy with other castles throughout the central Balkans, be it architectural constructions, and also for their function and destination, being that some structures are still a mystery as to what they functioned for and how they were used. Harilaq Castle presents the most excavated area, compared to castles of the same period in Kosovo.

Geographic Position 

The Castle is located about 9 kilometers to the south-west of Fushe Kosova, and about 16 kilometers south-west of Pristina. It is located on a forested hillock, at the highest isohypse and occupies an area of approx. 1.3 hectares. It does not have a regular geometric shape. On the west side, it connects with the Golesh hill, which commands the highest above sea level altitude of 1019 meters, while on the south-east, only 2.5 kilometers away is the Prishtina Airport. It has a mainly flat area on the south east, slightly elevated towards the north-west. The Fort possesses a unique geostrategic position, with the maximum altitude of 767 m above sea level and minimum of 736 m, from where can be controlled a large area of the Kosovo Field.
Before archaeological excavations started, there were no traces of the fortified rampart and of the interior architectural structures, which had been covered by soil and dense and diverse vegetation.

History of archaeological excavations 

The first archaeological trial trenches and test excavations were undertaken by the Archaeological Institute of Kosovo in 2005 and were a product of visits preceded by archaeological results of preliminary archaeological reconnaissance, during which are obtained indications of the existence of walls and architectural objects I this realm. Following the results obtained from these excavations survey, they were continued in 2006–2010 by the Museum of Kosova led by Fatmir Peja, head of Archaeology Sector at the Museum of Kosovo. During the survey and excavation expeditions there were detected: rampart, architectural object inside the wall and a considerable amount of movable archaeological inventory.

Discovered architectural objects 

During the archaeological excavation expeditions of 2005–2010, except the rampart, there were discovered distinctive architectural objects which are specific to this castle only, as: the variety of building techniques, the shape of the rampart, and interior objects, which for now, are unique. In the absence of analogy with any other castles discovered in the central Balkans, their exact destination cannot be determined. These objects are characterized in a closed environment, also by the binding material of masonry that is used: mortar composed of lime and river sand, sand mixed with lime and crushed bricks, which dominate as plaster in certain locations, and mud. The Harilaq Fortress is built on the remain of an earlier prehistoric settlement, attested by the archaeological findings.

See also 
Archaeology of Kosovo
List of settlements in Illyria

References

External links 
http://penelope.uchicago.edu/Thayer/E/Roman/Texts/Procopius/Buildings/home.html, retrieved 17 March 2013.
http://www.balkaninsight.com/en/article/kosovo-s-buried-treasures-stay-underground, retrieved 17 March 2013.
https://www.youtube.com/watch?v=on5pVYaaeFo, retrieved 17 March 2013.
https://www.youtube.com/watch?v=abt3p0kGNLM, retrieved 17 March 2013.

Archaeological discoveries in Kosovo
Historic sites in Kosovo
Archaeological sites in Kosovo
Illyrian Kosovo
Archaeology of Illyria
Dardanians